Veréb, Vereb is Hungarian surname, which means "sparrow":
 Edward "Ed" John Vereb (born 1934, Pittsburgh, Pennsylvania), an American football halfback
 István Veréb (born 1987), a Hungarian male freestyle wrestler
 Krisztián Veréb (born 1977), a Hungarian sprint canoer
 Mike Vereb, a Republican member of the Pennsylvania House of Representatives
 Michael Vereb, a Canadian businessperson

See also 
Vili, a veréb ("Willy the Sparrow"), a 1988 Hungarian animated film directed by József Gémes
Vereb, a village in Fejér county, Hungary
Vrabec (Czech surname)

Hungarian words and phrases
Hungarian-language surnames